Białykał (formerly: Biały Kał) is a village in the administrative district of Gmina Pakosław, within Rawicz County, Greater Poland Voivodeship, in west-central Poland.

The village has an approximate population of 150.

In 1999, the village changed its name, from Biały Kał, because it evoked a bad association, as the phrase literally means "White Feces".

References

Villages in Rawicz County